Porque te quiero así (Spanish: Because I Love You That Way) is a Uruguayan telenovela produced and broadcast on Channel 10. It stars Jorge Echagüe and Florencia Peña, while the second season airs Catherine Fulop. It was released on July 20, 2010.

Plot summary 
Susana Macedo (Florencia Peña) has lived in Spain for 3 years and decides to return to Montevideo just to sign the divorce papers with her ex-husband Washington Sosa (Jorge Esmoris). There she will meet Lito González (Jorge Echagüe), with whom she had a romantic history in the past and will try not to meet him, to quickly return to Europe. However, everything changes when Omar Macedo (Adhemar Rubbo), Susana's father and president of the Olympic Sports Club, suffers a health problem and is forced to abandon the position. At the request of her father, Susana must participate in elections, in which Lito and Washington also participate. A dispute will begin between the three candidates, which will lead to debates, provocations, alliances and betrayals. Finally they will be forced to choose between love for the shirt or for the other.

Cast 

 Florencia Peña as Susana Macedo (Season 1)
 Jorge Echagüe as Miguel "Lito" González
 Jorge Esmoris as Washington Sosa
 Rubén Rada as Nelson (Season 1)
 Catherine Fulop as Alejandra Guzmán (Season 2)
 Gustaf van Perinostein as Silvio
 Cristina Morán as Chela
 Humberto de Vargas as Rubens Robaina
 Noelia Campo as Carolina Macedo
 Virginia Ramos as Pochi
 Florencia Zabaleta as Rosario González
 Martín Cardozo as Juanjo González
 Adhemar Rubbo as Omar Macedo
 Mauricio Jortak as Santiago (Season 1)
 Diego Delgrossi as Julio
 Graciela Rodriguez as Francesca Schiaretti (Season 2)
 Nicolás Furtado as Ciro Schiaretti/Ciro González Guzmán (Season 2)
 Ariel Caldarelli as Giovanni Schiaretti (Season 2)
 Rafael Beltrán as Pablo (Season 2)
 Lucía David de Lima as Isabel (Season 2)
 Ernesto Liotti as Ángelo (Season 2)
 Gaspar Valverde as Darío (Season 2)

Production 
The first season premiered on July 20, 2010, and ended on November 2, 2010 with 16 chapters aired.

It was scripted by the Argentine Adriana Lorenzón, author of Montecristo, Los Roldán and El Capo, directed by Eduardo Ripari (Los Exitosos Pells, Montecristo, Los Roldán, Criminal) and produced in HD, the fiction has a casting of excellence led by the well-known Argentine actress Florencia Peña (La Niñera & Casados con Hijos) and important local figures, such as Coco Echagüe, Jorge Esmoris and Rubén Rada.

After the success of the series, it was renewed for a second season, which starred Catherine Fulop, and was broadcast between July 26, 2011 and November 1, 2011. It had 40 episodes and a Special Program.

Awards and nominations

References 

Uruguayan television series
2010 telenovelas
Canal 10 (Uruguay) original programming